Guwa may be,

Guwa language
Sechen Guwa